The 167th Airlift Squadron (167 AS) is a unit of the West Virginia Air National Guard 167th Airlift Wing located at Shepherd Field Air National Guard Base, Martinsburg, West Virginia.  It is equipped with the C-17 Globemaster III, heavy airlifter.

History

World War II
 see: 359th Fighter Group for full World War II history
Organized and trained in New England during 1943.  Moved to England in January 1944, being assigned to VIII Fighter Command.  Entered combat in Spring 1944, supported the invasion of Normandy during June 1944 by patrolling the English Channel, escorting bombardment formations to the French coast, and dive-bombing and strafing bridges, locomotives, and rail lines near the battle area.  After D-Day, engaged chiefly in escorting bombers to oil refineries, marshalling yards, and other targets in such cities as Ludwigshafen, Stuttgart, Frankfurt, Berlin, Merseburg, and Brux.   Continued combat operations until the German capitulation in May 1945.   Returned to the United States and was inactivated in November 1945.

West Virginia Air National Guard

The Air National Guard designated the State of West Virginia as the resident state for the fighter squadron. On 24 May 1946, Charleston's Kanawha Airport became the home base for the renamed 167th Fighter Squadron. The unit reactivated on 5 January 1947 and federally recognized effective 7 March 1947. The assigned strength: 19 officers and 35 airmen. Within six months, the unit attained full manning strength. Early aircraft included the T-6 Trainer, the F-47 Thunderbolt and the F-51 Mustang. The name, mission, size and even the site changed over the next 60 years, but the numbers "167" have remained constant with the West Virginia Air National Guard.

On 10 October 1950, the unit and all personnel were sworn in for 21 months of active duty during the Korean War. Most personnel and all aircraft became part of the 123d Fighter-Bomber Wing, located at Godman AFB, Kentucky. Some members transferred to RAF Manston near London, England, flying F-84 Thunderjet aircraft. Other seasoned (experienced) pilots transferred to Far East Air Force for combat duty in the Korean War.

Released from active duty on 9 July 1952, the 167th Fighter Interceptor Squadron returned to Charleston, West Virginia and the F-51 Mustang aircraft. The unit name changed to the 167th Fighter Bomber Squadron on 1 December 1952.

Because of limitations at Kanawha Airport at that time, that could not accommodate jet aircraft, a search for a new home in West Virginia began. Two sites considered were Beckley and Martinsburg. The cost of improvements at Beckley came to $5,978,000 and for Martinsburg $3,093,000. Though Beckley campaigned hard, Martinsburg received approval as the new site on 21 September 1955. Martinsburg had to raise funds to purchase the 200 acres needed to expand the runway. Two hundred citizens signed notes, totaling over $160,000, to guarantee sufficient money for buying the land until a bond issue could be voted on by the citizens. The official move came on 3 December 1955, when the 167th left Charleston and opened on 4 December 1955 at Martinsburg. Shortly thereafter, equipment moved to the new site and active recruiting commenced to achieve full authorized personnel strength.

New construction and the increase of manpower continued in 1956. The aircraft assigned included the F-51 Mustang, T-6 Trainer, and a C-47 Skytrain. The immediate need became to recruit 70 airmen and 10 officers. By 1956, manning grew to a strength of 399 airmen and 44 officers. The 167th Fighter Interceptor Squadron dedicated its new facilities on 4 October 1958. On 10 November 1958, the unit became the 167th Tactical Fighter Squadron and a member of the Tactical Air Command.

In 1956 and 1957, the unit flew F-51 Mustangs and T-28's. The 167th was the last Air National Guard squadron flying the F-51 Mustang. Following a two-year construction phase the unit received single engine jet fighter/interceptors, the F-86 Sabre.

In an announcement on 31 January 1961, the 167th learned it would gain change aircraft. On 1 April, the unit received C-119 Flying Boxcars, manufactured by Fairchild. A new mission and name change also took effect: The 167th Aeromedical Transport Squadron, Light. The mission became evacuation and care of the sick and wounded. The changes resulted in an increase of manpower and the addition of nurses to the unit. The authorized strength had grown to 572 total airmen and officers.

Aircraft changes in 1963 saw the arrival of the C-121 Super Constellation with its worldwide operating capability. Staffing increased to 604 enlisted and 107 officers. Overseas missions flown to Puerto Rico, the Azores, France, England, West Germany, Spain and Bermuda were not uncommon. The unit began flying missions to the Pacific areas in 1965 and 1966. During 1966, the Super Constellations made 103 overseas flights, including 26 to South Vietnam and 77 to other outpost such as Thailand, Australia, Japan and the Philippines, carrying 1198 tons of military cargo and 1390 passengers.

The unit anticipated that it would be inactivated 1 July 1967, since no projected program had been specified beyond that date. A new campaign began to find new aircraft, a new mission or to justify continuance of the old mission. Senator Robert C. Byrd became active in securing a new mission. An announcement in December stated that the unit would be assigned an aeromedical aircraft mission, thus keeping the unit alive.  Nurses became a particularly critical specialty during this period. New construction included an engine build-up shop, squadron operations building, maintenance dock, civil engineering and aerospace ground equipment buildings.

In 1972, the unit began the transition into the Lockheed C-130 Hercules and, as a result, another new mission. In June of that year, the unit became the 167th Tactical Airlift Group and moved from the Military Airlift Command to the Tactical Airlift Command. Late in 1977, the unit received "B" model C-130s. The 1986, the number of aircraft assigned increased, and in 1989, the "B" model was replaced with the "E" model.

1 June 1992, saw the unit's name change again. This time, the 167th Tactical Airlift Group became the 167th Airlift Group. Reorganization placed the unit in the Air Mobility Command. Other activities involving the unit were hosting of the Apple Harvest Festival in October, a Volant Oak rotation in October and November and the involvement of aircraft and crews with Operation Provide Promise. Provide Promise support took place from July 1992 to January 1993.

In 1995, the unit began conversion training for the C-130H-3 in the first quarter and transferred most of the "E" models to the Illinois Air National Guard 182d Airlift Wing, Peoria, Illinois. The unit celebrated its 40th anniversary on 10 June 1995 with an open house and dance.

The 167th Airlift Group was redesignated the 167th Airlift Wing on 1 October 1995. The 167th Airlift Squadron was reassigned to the new 167th Operations Group under the objective wing structure of the new Wing.

Since the 11 September 2001, terrorist attacks on New York City and Washington, D.C., the unit has had members deployed to the four corners of the world in support of Operations ENDURING FREEDOM and IRAQI FREEDOM. Unit members have received six Bronze Stars and two Purple Hearts in support of these operations.

In March 2002, West Virginia Senator Robert Byrd announced that the unit would transition to the C-5 Galaxy aircraft. On 4 December 2006 the first C-5 aircraft assigned to the unit landed at Shepherd Field. Ten more aircraft were assigned to the squadron.

On 28 March 2007 the unit launched its first C-5 mission from Shepherd Air Field. After a brief stop at Dover Air Force Base, the aircraft continued on to Camp Lemonier, Djibouti, Africa, delivering two CH-53E Super Stallion helicopters (used for humanitarian assistance, personnel and equipment movement, and noncombatant casualty evacuations) and more than 60 marines supporting Combined Joint Task Force – Horn of Africa.

Recently, the 167th Airlift Wing was tasked to provide transportation for NASA's Ares I-X Crew Module, Launch Abort System Simulator, and related equipment. On 27 January 2009 the unit launched a C-5 aircraft to the Shuttle Landing Facility located at Langley Air Force Base, Virginia. The crew loaded a 70-foot trailer carrying the Launch Abort System and a 50-foot trailer carrying the Crew Module. The cargo was delivered to the Kennedy Space Center in Florida the following day.

Since 2003, approximately $280,000,000 has been utilized in the C-5 facility conversion program. These projects include site prep, an air control tower, a flight simulator facility, ramp and hydrant upgrades, a corrosion control hangar, a fuel cell hangar, runway upgrades and extensions, a fire station, a supply warehouse, apron and jet fuel storage, taxiway upgrades, and a new squadron operations facility is in progress.

Lineage

 Constituted 369th Fighter Squadron on 20 December 1942
 Activated on 15 January 1943
 Inactivated on 10 November 1945
 Re-designated 167th Fighter Squadron, and allotted to West Virginia ANG, on 24 May 1946.
 Received federal recognition on 7 March 1947
 Federalized and placed on active duty, 10 October 1950
 Re-designated: 167th Fighter-Bomber Squadron on 10 October 1950
 Federalized and placed on active duty, 10 October 1950
 Released from active duty and returned to West Virginia state control, 10 July 1952
 Re-designated: 167th Tactical Fighter Squadron on 10 November 1958
 Re-designated: 167th Aeromedical Transport Squadron, Light, 1 April 1961
 Re-designated  167th Air Transport Squadron, 18 January 1964
 Re-designated  167th Military Airlift Squadron, 1 January 1966
 Re-designated  167th Aeromedical Airlift Squadron, 1 August 1967
 Re-designated: 167th Tactical Airlift Squadron, 1 July 1972
 Re-designated: 167th Airlift Squadron, 1 June 1992

Assignments
 359th Fighter Group, 15 Jan 1943 – 10 Nov 1945
 55th Fighter Wing, 7 March 1957
 123d Fighter-Bomber Wing, 10 Oct 1950 – 10 July 1952
 121st Fighter-Bomber Group, 10 July 1952
 121st Fighter-Interceptor Group, 1 November 1952
 121st Fighter-Bomber Group, 1 November 1957
 133d Air Transport Group, 1 April 1961
 133d Military Airlift Group, 8 January 1966
 133d Tactical Airlift Group, 20 March 1971
 167th Tactical Airlift Group, 1 July 1972
 167th Airlift Group, 1 June 1992
 167th Operations Group, 1 October 1995 – Present

Stations

 Westover Field, Massachusetts, 15 January 1943
 Grenier Field, New Hampshire, 6 April 1943
 Republic Field, Long Island, New York, 26 May 1943
 Westover Field, Massachusetts, 24 Aug – 2 Oct 1943
 RAF East Wretham (AAF-133), England, c. 18 Oct 1943 – c. 4 November 1945
 Camp Kilmer, New Jersey, 9–10 Nov 1945.

 Kanawha Airport, Charleston, West Virginia, 7 March 1947
 Operated from: Godman AFB, Kentucky, 20 October 1950
 Operated from: RAF Manston, England, Nov 1951 – 10 Jul 1952
 Shepherd Field (later Eastern WV Regional Airport), Martinsburg, West Virginia, 4 December 1955
 Designated: Shepherd Field Air National Guard Base, West Virginia, 1991–Present

Aircraft

 P-47 Thunderbolt, 1943–1944
 P-51 Mustang, 1944–1945
 F-51 Mustang, 1947–1950
 F-51 Mustang, 1947–1950; 1952–1957
 F-84 Thunderjet, 1950–1952

 F-86 Sabre, 1957–1961
 C-119 Flying Boxcar, 1961–1963
 C-121 Super Constellation, 1963–1971
 C-130 Hercules, 1971–2006
 C-5 Galaxy, 2006– 2014
 C-17 Globemaster III, 2015–Present

References

External links 

Squadrons of the United States Air National Guard
167
Military units and formations in West Virginia
West Virginia Air National Guard
1943 establishments in Massachusetts
Military units and formations established in 1943